The Engelbert–Schmidt zero–one law is a theorem that gives a mathematical criterion for an event associated with a continuous, non-decreasing additive functional of Brownian motion to have probability either 0 or 1, without the possibility of an intermediate value. This zero-one law is used in the study of questions of finiteness and asymptotic behavior for stochastic differential equations. (A Wiener process is a mathematical formalization of Brownian motion used in the statement of the theorem.) This 0-1 law, published in 1981, is named after Hans-Jürgen Engelbert and the probabilist Wolfgang Schmidt (not to be confused with the number theorist Wolfgang M. Schmidt).

Engelbert–Schmidt 0–1 law
Let  be a Wiener process on the probability space .
Suppose that  is a Borel measurable function of the real line into [0,∞].
Then the following three assertions are equivalent:

(i) .

(ii) .

(iii)  for all compact subsets  of the real line.

Extension to stable processes
In 1997 Pio Andrea Zanzotto proved the following extension of the Engelbert–Schmidt zero-one law. It contains Engelbert and Schmidt's result as a special case, since the Wiener process is a real-valued stable process of index .

Let  be a -valued stable process of index  on the filtered probability space .
Suppose that  is a Borel measurable function.
Then the following three assertions are equivalent:

(i) .

(ii) .

(iii)  for all compact subsets  of the real line.

The proof of Zanzotto's result is almost identical to that of the Engelbert–Schmidt zero-one law. The key object in the proof is the local time process associated with stable processes of index , which is known to be jointly continuous.

See also
zero-one law

References

Probability theorems